Fyffe is a surname. Notable people with the surname include:

Charles Alan Fyffe (1845–1892), English historian
Jahmaal Fyffe (born 1990), English hip-hop rapper who has performed as Chip and as Chipmunk (rapper)
Jim Fyffe (1945–2003), American sportscaster and radio talk show host
Joseph P. Fyffe (1832–1896), American admiral
Kelly Fyffe-Marshall, Canadian filmmaker
Nick Fyffe (born 1972), English musician
Will Fyffe (1885–1947), Scottish actor, singer, and songwriter
 Dorsey Fyffe (1974- ) AFSOC Flight Engineer, Operation Jaque 2008, program manager